Senator Cisneros may refer to:

Carlos Cisneros (1948–2019), New Mexico Senate
Roger Cisneros (1924–2017), Colorado State Senate